is a Japanese film director, producer, screenwriter, and editor. He began his career in television and has since directed more than a dozen feature films, including Nobody Knows (2004), Still Walking (2008), and After the Storm (2016). He won the Jury Prize at the 2013 Cannes Film Festival for Like Father, Like Son and won the Palme d'Or at the 2018 Cannes Film Festival for Shoplifters.

Personal life

Kore-eda's father was born in Taiwan before being conscripted into the Japanese military during World War II and detained in Siberia for 3 years after the end of the war. His paternal grandparents could not marry under Japanese law at the time as they had the same last name, so they eloped to Taiwan where they could, which was then under Japanese colonial rule.  He has cited this as a reason for his affinity toward Taiwan.

Kore-eda was born in Nerima, Tokyo, Japan. He is the youngest of three children with two older sisters. From a young age, Kore-eda would spend time watching movies with his mother. He said through an interpreter, "My mother loved films! She adored Ingrid Bergman, Joan Fontaine, Vivien Leigh. We couldn’t afford to go together to the cinema, but she was always watching their movies on TV. She stopped all family business or discussions to watch these movies. We would watch together. So I adored film – like her."

After seeing Japan win the gold medal in men's volleyball at the 1972 Munich Olympics, he started playing in middle school. He rose to team captain in high school as a setter.

He initially failed his entrance exams, but was accepted into Waseda University a year later. After graduating from Waseda University's Graduate School of Letters, Arts and Sciences in 1987, Kore-eda worked on documentaries, where he was subject to aggressive management.  He has cited this as being the reason he tries to avoid becoming angry on his sets and to encourage a happy work environment.

Kore-eda was married in 2002 and has one daughter, born in 2007.

Career 
Before embarking on a career as a film director, Kore-eda worked as an assistant director on documentaries for television. He eventually transitioned into directing, and directed his first television documentary, Lessons from a Calf, in 1991. He directed several other documentary films thereafter.

In 1995, at the Venice Film Festival, his first fiction feature film Maborosi won a Golden Osella Award for Best Cinematography. At the first Buenos Aires International Festival of Independent Cinema in 1999, he won awards for Best Film and Best Screenplay for his film After Life.

In 2005, he won the Blue Ribbon Awards for Best Film and Best Director for his film Nobody Knows. His 2008 film, Still Walking, also earned accolades, including Best Director at the 2009 Asian Film Awards, and the Golden Ástor for Best Film at the 2008 Mar del Plata International Film Festival.

His 2013 film, Like Father, Like Son, premiered and was nominated for the Palme d'Or at the 2013 Cannes Film Festival. It eventually did not win, but it won the Jury Prize, as well as a commendation from the Ecumenical Jury. In October 2013, the film won the Rogers People's Choice Award at the 2013 Vancouver International Film Festival.

Kore-eda's 2015 film, Our Little Sister, was selected to compete for the Palme d'Or at the 2015 Cannes Film Festival, though it did not win. His 2016 film, After the Storm, debuted to critical acclaim at the 2016 Cannes Film Festival in the Un Certain Regard category. For his work on the film, he won the award for Best Director at the Yokohama Film Festival. Kore-eda won Best Film and Best Director Japan Academy Prizes for his film The Third Murder (2017), which also screened in the main competition of the 74th Venice International Film Festival.

In 2018, his film, titled Shoplifters, about a young girl who is welcomed in by a family of shoplifters, premiered at the Cannes Film Festival, where it won the Palme d'Or. It was also nominated for the Academy Award for Best Foreign Language Film.

In 2018, he won the Donostia Award for his lifetime achievement at San Sebastián International Film Festival.

In 2019, Kore-eda directed The Truth, starring Catherine Deneuve, Juliette Binoche and Ethan Hawke. It is his first film shot in Europe and not in his native language.

In 2021, Kore-eda directed Broker. The film was shot in South Korea, featuring a predominantly South Korean cast and crew. It was first released on June 8, 2022. The film was selected to compete for the Palme d'Or at the Cannes Film Festival in 2022 and won the Prize of the Ecumenical Jury.

In January 2022, it was announced that Kore-eda would be working with a team of directors including Megumi Tsuno, Hiroshi Okuyama, and Takuma Sato on a nine-episode series called The Makanai: Cooking for the Maiko House, adapted from the manga Kiyo in Kyoto.

Style and influences
According to the Harvard Film Archive, Kore-eda's works "reflect the contemplative style and pacing of such luminaries as Hou Hsiao-hsien and Tsai Ming-liang".

Kore-eda is most often compared to Yasujirō Ozu, however he has stated he feels more influenced by British director Ken Loach and Japanese director Mikio Naruse.

In a 2009 interview, Kore-eda revealed that Still Walking is based on his own family.

Filmography

Film

Television
Nonfix (1991)
Without Memory (1996) 
Kaidan Horror Classics (2010)
Going My Home (2012)
Ishibumi (2015)
A Day-Off of Kasumi Arimura (2020; episode 1, 3)
The Makanai: Cooking for the Maiko House (2023)

Accolades

1995: Vancouver International Film Festival – Dragons and Tigers Award (Maborosi)
1998: San Sebastian Film Festival – FIPRESCI Prize (After Life)
1998: Three Continents Festival – Golden Montgolfiere (After Life)
1999: Buenos Aires International Festival of Independent Cinema – Best Film and Best Screenplay (After Life)
2004: Flanders International Film Festival Ghent – Grand Prix (Nobody Knows)
2005: Blue Ribbon Awards – Best Film and Best Director (Nobody Knows)
2008: Mar del Plata International Film Festival – Best Film (Still Walking)
2009: Asian Film Awards – Best Director (Still Walking)
2009: Blue Ribbon Awards – Best Director (Still Walking)
2011: San Sebastian Film Festival – Best Screenplay (I Wish)
2012: Asia-Pacific Film Festival – Best Director (I Wish)
2013: Cannes Film Festival – Jury Prize (Like Father, Like Son)
2013: Asia-Pacific Film Festival – Best Film and Best Director (Like Father, Like Son)
2013: São Paulo International Film Festival – Audience Award Best Foreign Film (Like Father, Like Son)
2013: Vancouver International Film Festival – Audience Award International Films (Like Father, Like Son)
2013: Yokohama Film Festival – Best Screenplay (Like Father, Like Son)
2015: San Sebastian Film Festival – Audience Award Best Film (Our Little Sister)
2015: Yokohama Film Festival – Best Director (Our Little Sister)
2016: Japan Academy Prize – Best Film and Best Director (Our Little Sister)
2016: Films from the South – Best Film (After the Storm)
2018: Japan Academy Prize – Best Film, Best Director, Best Screenplay, and Best Editing (The Third Murder)
2018: Cannes Film Festival – Palme d'Or (Shoplifters)
2018: Los Angeles Film Critics Association – Best Foreign Film (Shoplifters)
2018: San Sebastián International Film Festival – Donostia Award
2018: Asia Pacific Screen Awards – Best Film (Shoplifters)
2018: Denver Film Festival – Best Film (Shoplifters)
2018: Filmfest München – Best International Film (Shoplifters)
2018: Films from the South – Audience Award (Shoplifters)
2018: Vancouver International Film Festival – Most Popular International Feature (Shoplifters)
 2019: Asian Film Awards – Best Film (Shoplifters)
2019: Japan Academy Prize – Best Film, Best Director, and Best Screenplay (Shoplifters)
2019: César Award – Best Foreign Film (Shoplifters)
2019: Guldbagge Awards – Best Foreign Film (Shoplifters)
 2023: Asian Film Awards – Best Director (Broker)

Frequent collaborators
Kore-eda often casts the same actors in his narrative films, in particular Kirin Kiki and Susumu Terajima, both of whom have appeared in six of Kore-eda's films. Other performers who have collaborated with Kore-eda on multiple films include Hiroshi Abe, Arata, Tadanobu Asano, Lily Franky, Isao Hashizume, Ryo Kase, and Yui Natsukawa.

Notes

References

Further reading

 
Ellis, Jonathan. "After Life" (Review). Film Quarterly, Vol. 57, Issue no. 1, pp. 32–37. ISSN 0015-1386.
"This is your life: Tony Rayns interviews After Life's director Koreeda Hirokazu". Sight & Sound. March 1999.
Martonova, Andronika (2016). "Boys don't cry: the image of the children as a social problem in Hirokazu Koreeda's films". Central Asian Journal of Art Studies, pр. 55–64.

External links

1962 births
Living people
Japanese film directors
Best Director International Eurasia Award winners
Japanese documentary filmmakers
Waseda University alumni
Directors of Palme d'Or winners
Best Director Asian Film Award winners